Craig Wight (born 24 July 1978) is a former Scottish footballer who played as a goalkeeper.

Club career
Wight started his career with Arbroath in 1997, before leaving in 2002. He spent time at the Kentucky-based Lindsey Wilson College and Tennessee-based Cumberland University in America, before returning to Scotland to play for Livingston. He then returned to Arbroath in 2007, before joining East Fife in the January 2008 transfer market.

After a short career break, in which he returned to the Lindsey Wilson College to assume the position of assistant manager, Wight returned with First Division side Raith Rovers, but failed to make an appearance before joining fellow First Division side Cowdenbeath, initially as a goalkeeping coach. Wight made two appearances during his time with the Cowdenbeath-based side.

After a short spell with lower division side Berwick Rangers as a player-goalkeeping coach, Wight moved to Finland to join Veikkausliiga side IFK Mariehamn in 2016, while also working as a goalkeeping coach and assistant manager for Kakkonen side FC Åland. He was named interim manager for the end of the 2016 season.

References

External links
 
 
 2002–03 Stats
 Profile at Mariehamn Official Website

1978 births
Living people
Scottish footballers
Scottish expatriate footballers
Association football goalkeepers
Livingston F.C. players
Arbroath F.C. players
East Fife F.C. players
Cowdenbeath F.C. players
Berwick Rangers F.C. players
IFK Mariehamn players
Stirling Albion F.C. players
Scottish Football League players
Scottish Professional Football League players
Kakkonen players
Veikkausliiga players
Expatriate footballers in Finland
FC Åland players
Lindsey Wilson Blue Raiders men's soccer players
Cumberland University alumni
Carlisle United F.C. non-playing staff
Yeovil Town F.C. non-playing staff
Association football goalkeeping coaches